The National Committee of the Chinese Energy and Chemical Workers’ Union is a national industrial union of the All-China Federation of Trade Unions in the People's Republic of China.

External links

Basic information from the ACFTU

National industrial unions (China)
Chemical industry trade unions
Energy industry trade unions